Christián Jaroš (born 2 April 1996) is a Slovak professional ice hockey defenceman for HC CSKA Moscow of the Kontinental Hockey League (KHL). Jaroš was drafted 139th overall in the 2015 NHL Entry Draft by the Ottawa Senators.

Playing career
Jaros made his Swedish Hockey League debut playing with Luleå HF during the 2014–15 SHL season.

On 30 May 2017, Jaroš was signed to a three-year, entry-level contract by the Ottawa Senators. He made his NHL debut on 10 October 2017 against Vancouver Canucks but spent the rest of the season with their American Hockey League team, the Belleville Senators.

Despite beginning the 2018–19 season in the American Hockey League, Jaroš was recalled to the NHL and he scored his first career NHL goal on 21 November 2018 in a 6–4 loss to the Minnesota Wild.

On 27 January 2021, he was traded by the Senators to the San Jose Sharks. He made his debut for the Sharks on 6 April 2021, in a 1–5 loss to the Anaheim Ducks. His first point came four days later, assisting Dylan Gambrell for the first Sharks goal, in a 2–4 defeat to the Los Angeles Kings.

On 26 July 2021, Jaroš was traded by the San Jose Sharks to the New Jersey Devils in exchange for Nick Merkley. In the following  season, Jaroš remained on the Devils roster, serving in a depth defenseman role. He appeared in 11 games for the Devils before he was placed on waivers and re-assigned to AHL affiliate, the Utica Comets, at the NHL trade deadline, on 21 March 2022. After failing to report to the AHL, Jaroš was placed on unconditional waivers in order to mutually terminate the remainder of his contract with the Devils on 24 March 2022.

On 9 June 2022, Jaroš signed one-year contract with Avangard Omsk of the Kontinental Hockey League (KHL). In the 2022–23 season, Jaroš featured in 24 games from the blueline for Avangard, registering 3 goals and 9 points. On 23 December 2022, Jaroš was traded by Avangard Omsk to HC CSKA Moscow in exchange for Dmitri Alexeyev.

Personal life
Jaroš is a cousin of Erik Černák, who plays for the Tampa Bay Lightning and won a Stanley Cup in 2020 and 2021.

Career statistics

Regular season and playoffs

International

References

External links

1996 births
Living people
Asplöven HC players
Avangard Omsk players
Belleville Senators players
HC CSKA Moscow players
Luleå HF players
New Jersey Devils players
Ottawa Senators draft picks
Ottawa Senators players
San Jose Barracuda players
San Jose Sharks players
Slovak ice hockey defencemen
Slovak expatriate ice hockey players in Canada
Slovak expatriate ice hockey players in Sweden
Slovak expatriate ice hockey players in the United States
Sportspeople from Košice
Slovak expatriate ice hockey players in Russia